The Labour Party has more MPs in Greater London than any other political party, as of the 2019 general election. As of February 2019 the party holds 46 seats.

Members of Parliament

See also 
 List of parliamentary constituencies in London
 List of Conservative Party Members of Parliament in London
 List of Liberal Democrat Party Members of Parliament in London

External links 
 London Labour Party - London Members of Parliament

Labour
London
London Labour Party